Plasma Sources Science and Technology is an international journal dedicated solely to non-fusion aspects of plasma science. 

The journal is indexed in Scopus, INSPEC Information Services, ISI (SciSearch, ISI Alerting Services, Current Contents/Physical, Chemical and Earth Sciences), Chemical Abstracts, INIS Atomindex (International Nuclear Information System), NASA Astrophysics Data System, PASCAL Database, Article@INIST, Engineering Index/Ei Compendex, Cambridge Scientific Abstracts (Environmental Engineering Abstracts, Bioengineering Abstracts), and VINITI Abstracts Journal.

Editors in Chief

External links
Plasma Sources Science and Technology website
IOP Publishing

Plasma science journals
IOP Publishing academic journals